The Brditschka HB-3, HB-21 and HB-23 are a family of motor gliders of unorthodox configuration developed in Austria in the early 1970s.

Design and development
The unusual design was based on work done by Fritz Raab in Germany in the 1960s. The pilot and passengers sit in a fuselage pod with the engine and propeller behind them. The pod also carries the fixed tricycle undercarriage and the high cantilever wing. The tail is carried on a pair of booms that emerge from the top and bottom of the fuselage pod, the upper of which passes through the propeller hub. The HB-21 has a conventional tail and has two seats in tandem accessed by a sidewards-hinged canopy, while the HB-23 has a T-tail and side-by-side seating accessed via gull-wing doors in the canopy.

The Militky MB-E1 was a modified HB-3 with an 8-10 kW (11-13 hp) Bosch KM77 electric motor. It was the first full-sized, manned aircraft to be solely electrically powered. Its first flight was on 23 October 1973.

Variants
Brditschka HB-3Single seat powered sailplane, powered by  Rotax 642 engine,  wingspan.
HB-Flugtechnik HB 21Tandem two-seat derivative of HB-3 with longer span wings.
HB-Flugtechnik HB 21/2400
HB-Flugtechnik HB 21/2400 B
HB-Flugtechnik HB 21/2400 V1
HB-Flugtechnik HB 21/2400 V2
HB-Flugtechnik HB 23/2400
HB-Flugtechnik HB 23/2400 SP
HB-Flugtechnik HB 23/2400 Scanliner Observation version of HB-23 with bubble canopy and provision to carry FLIR or LLTV pods under the wings.
HB-Flugtechnik HB 23/2400 V2

Militky MB-E1 electrically powered version.

Specifications (HB-23/2400 Hobbyliner)

See also

References

External links

 fsg-grimming.at
 www.lokh.at - HB23 Daten

1970s Austrian sailplanes
HB-3
High-wing aircraft
Mid-engined aircraft
Single-engined pusher aircraft
Motor gliders
Aircraft first flown in 1971